Ernest Fredrich Neitzke (November 13, 1894 – April 27, 1977) was a utility player in Major League Baseball who played briefly for the Boston Red Sox during the  season. He was born in Toledo, Ohio.

Little is known about this outfielder/pitcher who played on a Red Sox uniform with few stars. Neitzke made eight outfield appearances at left field (4), right (3) and center (1), and also pitched 7⅔ innings of relief in two games, collecting a 6.14 ERA with one strikeout. four walks, and eight hits allowed without a decision.

In an 11-game career, Neitzke was a .240 hitter (6-for-25) with three runs, two RBI, and a .345 on-base percentage without an extra-base hit.

Neitzke died at the age of 82 in Sylvania, Ohio.

See also
1921 Boston Red Sox season

External links
Baseball Reference
Retrosheet

1894 births
1977 deaths
Boston Red Sox players
Major League Baseball outfielders
Major League Baseball pitchers
Baseball players from Ohio
London Tecumsehs (baseball) players
Pittsfield Hillies players
Saginaw Aces players
Hamilton Clippers players
Birmingham Barons players
Nashville Vols players
Hartford Senators players
Jersey City Skeeters players
Pueblo Steelworkers players
Pueblo Indians players
Wichita Aviators players
Topeka Senators players
Sportspeople from Toledo, Ohio